The Guy Medals are awarded by the Royal Statistical Society in three categories; Gold, Silver and Bronze. The Silver and Bronze medals are awarded annually. The Gold Medal was awarded every three years between 1987 and 2011, but is awarded biennially as of 2019. They are named after William Guy.

The Guy Medal in Gold is awarded to fellows or others who are judged to have merited a signal mark of distinction by reason of their innovative contributions to the theory or application of statistics.
The Guy Medal in Silver is awarded to any fellow or, in exceptional cases, to two or more fellows in respect of a paper/papers of special merit communicated to the Society at its ordinary meetings, or in respect of a paper/papers published in any of the journals of the Society. General contributions to statistics may also be taken into account.
The Guy Medal in Bronze is awarded to fellows, or to non-fellows who are members of a section or a local group, in respect of a paper or papers read to a section or local group or at any conference run by the Society, its sections or local groups, or published in any of the Society's journals. Preference will be given to people under the age of 35. Exceptionally two or more authors of a paper/papers may be considered for the award provided they are members of sections or local groups.

Gold Medalists  

1892 Charles Booth
1894 Robert Giffen
1900 Jervoise Athelstane Baines
1907 Francis Ysidro Edgeworth
1908 Patrick G. Craigie
1911 G. Udny Yule
1920 T. H. C. Stevenson
1930 A. William Flux
1935 Arthur Lyon Bowley
1945 Major Greenwood
1946 Ronald Fisher
1953 A. Bradford Hill
1955 Egon Pearson
1960 Frank Yates
1962 Harold Jeffreys
1966 Jerzy Neyman
1968 Maurice Kendall
1969 M. S. Bartlett
1972 Harald Cramér
1973 David Cox
1975 George Alfred Barnard
1978 Roy Allen
1981 David George Kendall
1984 Henry Daniels
1986 Bernard Benjamin
1987 Robin L. Plackett
1990 Peter Armitage
1993 George E. P. Box
1996 Peter Whittle
1999 Michael Healy
2002 Dennis Lindley
2005 John Nelder
2008 James Durbin
2011 C. R. Rao
2013 John Kingman
2014 Bradley Efron
2016 Adrian Smith
2019 Stephen Buckland
2020 David Spiegelhalter
2022 Nancy Reid

Silver Medalists 

 1893 John Glover
 1894 Augustus Sauerbeck
 1895 Arthur Lyon Bowley
 1897 F. J. Atkinson
 1899 C. S. Loch
 1900 Richard Crawford
 1901 Thomas A. Welton
 1902 R. H. Hooker
 1903 Yves Guyot
 1904 D. A. Thomas
 1905 R. Henry Rew
 1906 W. H. Shaw
 1907 N. A. Humphreys
 1909 Edward Brabrook
 1910 G. H. Wood
 1913 R. Dudfield
 1914 S. Rowson
 1915 S. J. Chapman
 1918 J. Shield Nicholson
 1919 J. C. Stamp
 1921 A. William Flux
 1927 H. W. Macrosty
 1928 Ethel Newbold
 1930 Herbert Edward Soper
 1934 J. H. Jones
 1935 Ernest Charles Snow
 1936 Ralph George Hawtrey
 1938 E. C. Ramsbottom
 1939 Leon Isserlis
 1940 Hector Leak
 1945 Maurice Kendall
 1950 Harry Campion
 1951 F. A. A. Menzler
 1952 M. S. Bartlett
 1953 J. Oscar Irwin
 1954 L. H. C. Tippett
 1955 David George Kendall
 1957 Henry Daniels
 1958 George Barnard
 1960 Edgar C. Fieller
 1961 David Cox
 1962 P. V. Sukhatme
 1964 George Box
 1965 C. R. Rao
 1966 Peter Whittle
 1968 Dennis Lindley
 1973 Robin Plackett
 1976 James Durbin
 1977 John Nelder
 1978 Peter Armitage
 1979 Michael Healy
 1980 M. Stone
 1981 John Kingman
 1982 Henry Wynn
 1983 Julian E. Besag
 1984 John C. Gittins
 1985 Derek Bissell and Wilfrid Pridmore
 1986 Richard Peto
 1987 John Copas
 1988 John Aitchison
 1989 Frank Kelly
 1990 David Clayton
 1991 Richard L. Smith
 1992 Robert Curnow
 1993 Adrian Smith
 1994 David Spiegelhalter
 1995 Bernard Silverman
 1996 Steffen Lauritzen
 1997 Peter Diggle
 1998 Harvey Goldstein
 1999 Peter Green
 2000 Walter Gilks
 2001 Philip Dawid
 2002 David Hand
 2003 Kanti Mardia
 2004 Peter Donnelly
 2005 Peter McCullagh
 2006 Michael Titterington
 2007 Howell Tong
 2008 Gareth Roberts
 2009 Sylvia Richardson
 2010 Iain M. Johnstone
 2011 Peter Hall
 2012 David Firth
 2013 Brian D. Ripley
 2014 Jianqing Fan
 2015 Anthony Davison
 2016 Nancy Reid
 2017 Neil Shephard
 2018 Peter Bühlmann
 2019 Susan Murphy
 2020 Arnaud Doucet
 2021 Håvard Rue
 2022 Paul Fearnhead

Bronze Medalists 

 1936 William Gemmell Cochran
 1938 R. F. George
 1949 W. J. Jennett
 1962 Peter Armitage
 1966 James Durbin
 1967 F. Downton
 1968 Robin Plackett
 1969 M. C. Pike
 1970 P. G. Moore
 1971 D. J. Bartholomew
 1974 G. N. Wilkinson
 1975 A. F. Bissell
 1976 P. L. Goldsmith
 1977 A. F. M. Smith
 1978 Philip Dawid
 1979 T. M. F. Smith
 1980 A. J. Fox
 1982 Stuart Pocock
 1983 Peter McCullagh
 1984 Bernard Silverman
 1985 David Spiegelhalter
 1986 D. F. Hendry
 1987 Peter Green
 1988 Sarah C. Darby
 1989 Sheila M. Gore
 1990 Valerie S. Isham
 1991 Mike G. Kenward
 1992 Christopher Jennison
 1993 Jonathan Tawn
 1994 R. F. A. Poultney
 1995 Iain Johnstone
 1996 John N. S. Matthews
 1997 Gareth Roberts
 1998 David Firth
 1999 Peter W. F. Smith and Jon Forster
 2000 Jon Wakefield
 2001 Guy Nason
 2002 Geert Molenberghs
 2003 Peter Lynn
 2004 Nicola Best
 2005 Steve Brooks
 2006 Matthew Stephens
 2007 Paul Fearnhead
 2008 Fiona Steele
 2009 Chris Holmes
 2010 Omiros Papaspiliopoulos
 2011 Nicolai Meinshausen
 2012 Richard Samworth
 2013 Piotr Fryzlewicz
 2014 Ming Yuan
 2015 Jinchi Lv
 2017 Yingying Fan
 2018 Peng Ding
 2019 Jonas Peters
 2020 Rachel McCrea
 2021 Pierre E. Jacob
 2022 Rajan Shah

See also
 List of mathematics awards

References

External links 
 Guy Medal. Royal Statistical Society website.

Awards of the Royal Statistical Society
Awards established in 1892
1892 establishments in the United Kingdom